The 1971 Torneio Norte-Nordeste was the fourth edition of a football competition held in Brazil. In the finals, Remo defeated Itabaiana 2–0 on aggregate to win their first title and earn the right to play in the finals of 1971 Campeonato Brasileiro Série B.

North Zone

|}

Northeast Zone

Finals

Remo won 2–0 on aggregate.

References

Torneio Norte-Nordeste
Torneio Norte-Nordeste